Książ is a castle in Silesia, Poland.

Książ may also refer to:
Książ Landscape Park, a protected area
Książ Wielkopolski, a town in west-central Poland
Książ Wielki, a village in southern Poland
Książ, Kuyavian-Pomeranian Voivodeship (north-central Poland)
Książ, Lublin Voivodeship (east Poland)
Książ, West Pomeranian Voivodeship (north-west Poland)